United States v. Sells Engineering, Inc., 463 U.S. 418 (1983), was a United States Supreme Court case concerning whether United States Department of Justice Civil Division attorneys were required to show particularized need in order to obtain disclosure.

Opinion of the Court
In an opinion delivered by Justice Brennan, the Court decided in favor of Sells Engineering.

External links
 

United States Supreme Court cases
1983 in United States case law
United States Supreme Court cases of the Burger Court
United States criminal procedure case law